Robert D. "Bob" Coble (born April 27, 1953) is a former mayor of Columbia, South Carolina. Coble has been a resident of Columbia for most of his life having graduated from Dreher High School in 1971 where he was student body president. Coble and Frannie Heizer won the 1971 South Carolina State High School Debate Championship. Coble graduated from the University of South Carolina in 1975 cum laude and the University of South Carolina School of Law in 1978 cum laude. Coble was elected to the Richland County Council in 1985 and served until 1988. Coble was elected Mayor of Columbia South Carolina in 1990 and served until 2010.  Mayor Coble was elected Mayor five times and in his last re-election in 2006 received 64% of the citywide vote.  He was succeeded as mayor by Steve Benjamin. Coble is married to Beth Coble, the daughter of former South Carolina Attorney General Daniel McLeod in 1978. They are the parents of six children and eleven grandchildren.

Tenure 
During Coble's tenure as Mayor Columbia's population grew by 27%. Downtown revitalization projects included the Gervais Streetscaping, a new Columbia Art Museum, Main Street Streetscaping, and new buildings including the Meridian and First Citizens as well as the new Sheraton on Main Street. Coble led a regional effort to develop the Three Rivers Greenway, the EdVenture Children's Museum, CanalSide, and the Columbia Convention Center. In October 2008, the city council voted in favor of Bob Coble's plan to prohibit smoking in all bars and restaurants in the City of Columbia.

In 1994 Coble and Columbia business leaders brought a lawsuit to remove the Confederate Flag from the Dome of the South Carolina Statehouse. The legal action was based on the fact that in 1961 the South Carolina Legislature raised the Confederate Flag over the Statehouse by a resolution rather than by statute. The lawsuit became moot and was dropped in 1995 when the Legislature adopted a statute authorizing the flag to fly on the Dome.

Also, during Coble's time as mayor, Columbia established sister city relationships with Kaiserslautern, Germany; Cluj-Napoca, Romania; Plovdiv, Bulgaria; Chelyabinsk, Russia; and Yibin, in the Sichuan Province, China. Coble led delegations from Columbia to visit those cities with the most active relationship being with Kaiserslautern. Coble also led a number of economic development missions to Germany and Europe and to Chengdu and China.

Accolades 
Coble received numerous awards including the Ambassador of the Year 2004 by the Greater Columbia Chamber of Commerce, the Knowledge Economy Award 2007 by SCRA, the Global Vision Award 2008 by the World Affairs Council, the Woodrow Wilson Award for Leadership in Historic Preservation 2009 by Historic Columbia Foundation, The Richland One School District Hall of Fame, the Urban League 2010 Dr. Martin Luther King Legacy Award, and Order of the Palmetto by Governor Mark Sanford June 2010. In December 2010 Coble was presented with an Honorary Degree of Doctor of Laws by the University of South Carolina. In October 2014 Coble received the Harriet Hancock Ally Leadership Award from the South Carolina Equality for his work as Mayor in promoting equality issues for the LGBT community. In January 2015 Coble was awarded the Martin Luther King Social Justice Award by the University of South Carolina.

At his retirement Columbia City Council named the portion of the Three Rivers Greenway behind EdVenture Children's Museum, Coble Plaza in his honor. Coble Plaza was dedicated and opened on July 3, 2013.  Also at his retirement, the Columbia Metropolitan Convention Center named part of the main ballroom the Coble Ballroom in his honor.

After Mayoralty 
Coble is now an attorney with the Nexsen Pruet Law Firm in Columbia South Carolina where he chairs the firm's South Carolina Public Policy Group. Coble currently is the Chair of the Columbia World Affairs Council, serves on the South Carolina Advisory Committee of the U.S. Global Leadership Coalition, and also serves on Winthrop University's West Forum Advisory Board.

On April 15, 2015, Coble had a heart attack in the South Carolina Statehouse while working there as a lobbyist and lawyer, but made a full recovery by August.

Coble married Beth McLeod, the daughter of former South Carolina Attorney General Daniel McLeod in 1978. Beth Coble founded the "First Ladies Walk for Life" by the Palmetto Health Foundation which raised funds for breast cancer research. The event averaged 8,000 walkers each year. They are the parents of six children and eleven grandchildren.  Coble's son, Daniel Coble, was elected in February 2022 by the South Carolina Legislature as a State Circuit Court Judge. https://www.thestate.com/news/politics-government/article257961168.html

References 

 https://web.archive.org/web/20090106160630/http://www.columbiasc.net/citycouncil/27

1953 births
Living people
Mayors of Columbia, South Carolina
South Carolina Democrats